Enrico Lang (born 31 March 1972) is an Italian male osteopath and retired racewalker, which participated at the 1995 World Championships in Athletics.

Achievements

References

External links
 

1972 births
Living people
Italian male racewalkers
World Athletics Championships athletes for Italy
20th-century Italian people